The Alberta Colleges Athletic Conference (ACAC) is the governing body for collegiate sports in Alberta, Canada.  Founded in 1964, as the Western Inter-College Conference, the ACAC is represented by eighteen schools, including one in Saskatchewan, that compete in ten sports.

The ACAC is a member of the Canadian Colleges Athletic Association, and provincial champions compete for national collegiate titles.

Teams
Ambrose University Lions in Calgary, Alberta
University of Alberta Augustana Campus Vikings in Camrose, Alberta
Briercrest College and Seminary Clippers in Caronport, Saskatchewan
Concordia University of Edmonton Thunder in Edmonton, Alberta
Grande Prairie Regional College Wolves in Grande Prairie, Alberta
Keyano College Huskies in Fort McMurray, Alberta
King's University Eagles in Edmonton, Alberta
Lakeland College (Alberta) Rustlers in Vermilion, Alberta
Lethbridge College Kodiaks in Lethbridge, Alberta
Medicine Hat College Rattlers in Medicine Hat, Alberta
Northern Alberta Institute of Technology Ooks in Edmonton, Alberta
Olds College Broncos in Olds, Alberta
Portage College Voyageurs in Lac La Biche, Alberta
Prairie College Pilots in Three Hills, Alberta
Red Deer College Kings/Queens in Red Deer, Alberta
SAIT Polytechnic Trojans in Calgary, Alberta
St. Mary's University Lightning in Calgary, Alberta

Sports

See also
Canadian Colleges Athletic Association

References

External links
 Alberta Colleges Athletic Conference
 Canadian Colleges Athletic Association

Sports governing bodies in Alberta
University and college sports in Canada
College athletics conferences in Canada